Geoffrey Hanley (born on 7 April 1972) is a politician from Saint Kitts and Nevis.

Hanley was elected MP to the National Assembly in the 2020 general election. Previously he worked as a principal and as a director in the department of youth.

He run for the leadership position of the Saint Kitts and Nevis Labour Party in November 2021, but lost to Terrance Drew. Hanley did get elected as deputy leader of the Labour party alongside Konris Maynard.

Following the Labour party victory in the August 2022 general election, Hanley was re-elected MP, and appointed as Deputy Prime Minister and minister of education.

References 

1972 births
Living people
Deputy Prime Ministers of Saint Kitts and Nevis
Education ministers of Saint Kitts and Nevis
Saint Kitts and Nevis Labour Party politicians